Gagan Chandra Chatterjee was a North Indian classical violinist of the Senia Gharana who is known for inventing the gatkari style of North Indian classical violin.

Early life and training 
Gagan Chandra Chatterjee was born in Allahabad on 1890. He learnt Hindustani classical music on sarod from the Senia gharana master Ustad Keramatullah Khan. However, he chose a different instrument for expressing the music he learnt. He could accurately play the gatkari styles of sitar and sarod on the violin and spent the rest of his life with this instrument. He also learnt from Lachhmandas Munimji, a well-known harmonium player, and Pran Krishna Chattopadhyay, a well-known dhrupad singer.

Career 
Gagan Chandra Chatterjee played extensively in music conferences of his time. He recorded a few classical tracks accompanied by piano in which he is credited as 'G.C. Chatterjee'.

Style 
Prior to him, Hindustani classical violinists used to play by mimicking vocal Hindustani classical music. However,
Hindustani classical music uses many techniques that are unique to sitar and sarod. Gagan Chandra Chatterjee
was the first person to bring those techniques over to the violin. He used to play the complete alaap-jor-jhala of Hindustani classical music which was heard only on sitar and sarod prior to him.

Students 
Although Gagan Chandra Chatterjee inspired many musicians across instruments, he did not leave behind many students.
His most well-known students were Sriram Srivastava and his younger brother Joi Srivastava.

References 

1890 births
1949 deaths
Hindustani instrumentalists
Hindustani violinists
Indian violinists
20th-century violinists
20th-century Indian musicians